KXRA may refer to:

 KXRA (AM), a radio station (1490 AM) licensed to Alexandria, Minnesota, United States
 KXRA-FM, a radio station (92.3 FM) licensed to Alexandria, Minnesota, United States